Flotsam is a 2015 Philippine romance film directed by Jay Abello. The screenplay was written by Jay Abello, Mickey Galang, and Joncy Sumulong. The film stars Solenn Heussaff, Rocco Nacino, Mara Lopez, Carla Humphries, and Adrian Cabido.

Cast

 Solenn Heussaff as Kai
 Rocco Nacino as Tisoy
 Carla Humphries as Mia
 Mara Lopez as Jamie
 Adrian Cabido as Angelo
 Gerard Garcia as Gerard Sison

References

External links
 

Films directed by Jay Abello